The Other Barrio is a 2015 neo-film noir directed by Dante Betteo, co-produced by Lou Dematteis, and based on the short story "The Other Barrio" by San Francisco Poet Laureate Alejandro Murguia. The film premiered on February 8, 2015 at the Brava Theater in San Francisco. The East Coast premiere was at the Independent Film Festival in Washington DC on February 26, 2015.

The film stars Veronica Valencia, Richard Montoya, and Philip Kan Gotanda.

Plot
San Francisco housing inspector Bob Morales (Montoya) as he investigates the suspicious circumstances of a fatal fire in a residential hotel in San Francisco's Latino Mission District and finds himself face to face with corruption at City Hall and the mysterious Sophia Nido (Valencia), a beautiful woman from his past.

This film, based on a story by San Francisco Poet Laureate Alejandro Murguia, addresses issues around gentrification and displacement of low-income communities. The film is based in part on the December 1975 fire at the Gartland Apartments at 16th and Valencia Streets in San Francisco.

Cast
Veronica Valencia	...	Sophia Nido
Richard Montoya	...	Bob Morales
Vincent Calvarese	...	Huey
Geoff Hoyle	...	Open Road
Nestor Cuellas		...	Undercover Police
Brian J. Patterson	...	La Jessica
Alexandra Tejeda Rieloff		...	La Noche Guest (voice)
Melinna Bobadilla		...	Miss Mary
James Hiser	...	Johnson
Pearl Wong		...	Pearl
Donald Lacy		...	Brother Sydell
Michael Torres	...	Crow
Sean San Jose	...	Sean
Christopher W. White	...	Christopher
Philip Kan Gotanda		...	Bob's Boss
David Louis Klein	...	Callahan

References

External links
 
 
 Huffington Post article
 Mission Local article

2015 films
Mission District, San Francisco